Anthima Reya (Night of Destiny) is a 1998 Sri Lankan Sinhala drama thriller film directed by Gamini Fonseka and produced by Lucky Dias. It stars director and producer themselves with Malani Fonseka in lead roles along with Cletus Mendis and Daya Alwis. Music composed by Somapala Rathnayake. It is the 901st Sri Lankan film in the Sinhala cinema.

The film was cited as the final appearance of Gamini Fonseka in films. This film also marked Gamini-Malani reunion in film after 21 years since 1977.

Plot

Cast
 Gamini Fonseka as Linton Cooray	 	
 Lucky Dias as Devendra Silva	 	
 Malini Fonseka as Luxmi	
 Mahendra Perera
 Daya Alwis
 Cletus Mendis
 Vinee Weththasinghe
 Thalatha Gunasekara
 Linton Semage
 Miyuri Samarasinghe
 Damayanthi Fonseka
 Udeni Alwis
 Edward Gunawardana
 Lal Kularatne
 Buddhi Wickrama
 Daya Thennakoon
 Teddy Vidyalankara
 Dinesh Priyasad
 Sujatha Paramanathan
 Ananda Tissa De Alwis		
 Shantha Saparamadu
 Wasantha Wittachchi
 Gamini Jayalath

References

External links
 
 Anthima Reya on YouTube

1998 films
1990s Sinhala-language films